Broadbridge is a surname. Notable people with the surname include:

Arthur Frederick Broadbridge (1915-2009), Canadian diplomat
Charles Broadbridge (1798–1841), English cricketer
Jem Broadbridge (1795–1843), English cricketer
John Broadbridge, English cricketer
Robert Broadbridge, English cricketer
Tom Broadbridge (born 1943), Australian film producer
Troy Broadbridge (1980-2004), Australian rules footballer
William Broadbridge (1790–1860), English cricketer

English-language surnames